Simmons Creek is a stream in Thurston County in the U.S. state of Washington. It is a tributary to the Eld Inlet.

Simmons Creek was named after the Simmons family, which harvested oysters.

References

Rivers of Thurston County, Washington
Rivers of Washington (state)